Grog  is a 1982 Italian film. For this film the director Francesco Laudadio was awarded with a David di Donatello for Best New Director.

Cast
Franco Nero
Omero Antonutti
Sandra Milo
Gabriele Ferzetti
Christian De Sica
Claudio Cassinelli
Eros Pagni
Franco Javarone
Lunetta Savino
Donatella Damiani
Renato Scarpa
Marina Confalone

See also        
 List of Italian films of 1982

References

External links

1982 films
Italian comedy-drama films
1980s Italian-language films
Films directed by Francesco Laudadio
1980s Italian films